Wave radio can refer to:

Bose wave systems
 WAVE Radio, a Belize City radio station

See also
Radio Waves (disambiguation)
Radio Wave 96.5